Olginsky District is an administrative and municipal district (raion), one of the twenty-two in Primorsky Krai, Russia. It is located in the southeast of the krai and borders with Kavalerovsky District in the north, the Sea of Japan in the east, southeast, and south, Lazovsky District in the southwest, and with Chuguyevsky District in the west. Its administrative center is the urban locality (an urban-type settlement) of Olga. Population:  The population of Olga accounts for 37.6% of the district's total population.

Geography
Slopes of south Sikhote-Alin and narrow coastline of the Sea of Japan are the most prominent features of the district territory's landscape. The largest bay is the Olga Bay.

History
The district was established in 1926 and originally encompassed the territories of modern Lazovsky and Kavalerovsky Districts and the territory presently subordinated to Dalnegorsk Town Under Krai Jurisdiction.

Notable residents 

Valentin Parinov (born 1959), swimmer, born in Olga 
Ivan Stolbovoy (born 1986), football player, born in Olga

References

Notes

Sources

Districts of Primorsky Krai
States and territories established in 1926